Zinin reaction or Zinin reduction was discovered by a Russian organic chemist Nikolay Zinin (Russian: Николай Николаевич Зинин) (25 August 1812, Shusha – 18 February 1880, Saint Petersburg). This reaction involves conversion of nitro aromatic compounds like nitrobenzene  to amines by reduction with sodium sulfides.  The reaction exhibits excellent selectivity for the nitro group and is useful in cases where other easily reduced functional groups (e.g., aryl halides and C=C bonds) are present in the molecule.  Moreover, dinitrobenzenes can often be reduced selectively to the nitroaniline.

Reaction mechanism
The precise details of the reaction mechanism remain obscure, but a basic outline is known.

The stoichiometry for the reaction is:
ArNO2   +   3 H2S   →   ArNH2   +   3 S   +   2 H2O
Mechanistic studies have shown that disulfide (which is likely to be generated in situ) is a more active reducing agent and may be involved.  The reaction is believed to proceed through oxygen transfer to sulfur to give ArNO, followed by further reduction to ArNHOH and, finally, to ArNH2.

Other Examples 
 Reduction of 4,6 (5,7)-dinitro and 5,6-dinitrobenzimidazoles

References

Name reactions
Organic reduction reactions
Organic redox reactions